EuroSpec, abbreviation for European Specification for Railway Vehicles, is an initiative of several European railway companies with the aim to develop common, explicit technical specifications for train systems and components. The work program includes doors, parking noise, TCMS, seating comfort and the revision of published specifications. The jointly developed specifications support and facilitate the process of purchasing trains. These specifications are not in the competitive domain. The continued application of the EuroSpec methodology and the developed specifications support the standardisation of trains and lead to higher quality, support the development of vehicle platforms and provide significant cost savings. As a basis for developing their specifications, EuroSpec partners have developed a "Requirement Management" manual to ensure the necessary consistency between the specifications and their quality. The work started in 2011.
The functional requirements for rail vehicles of the EuroSpec specifications are used in procurement in addition to the technical specifications for interoperability, the EN standards and the national notified technical rules (NNTR).
The EuroSpec consortium does not prepare "European Standards" or "International Standards" within the meaning of Regulation (EU) No 1025/2012 of the European Parliament and of the Council of 25 October 2012. EuroSpec specifications should therefore be classified as a "technical specification". They are increasingly used as input for European Standards and Regulations.

Members 
The EuroSpec consortium is composed of six European railway companies and the representation of the railway companies in the United Kingdom of Great Britain and Northern Ireland by RSSB. The EuroSpec partners in Europe by RSSB are:
 SNCF - France
 Rail Safety and Standards Board - United Kingdom of Great Britain and Northern Ireland
 Deutsche Bahn - Germany
 Nederlandse Spoorwegen - Netherlands
 ÖBB - Austria
 Swiss Federal Railways - Switzerland

Vision, mission, approach and values (version 2020) 
 The vision of EuroSpec is: To align passenger train operators’ needs to reduce the whole life cycle cost of the train, shorten the delivery time and speed up the innovation cycle and the deployment of innovations. 
 Our mission focusses on: less resources, less diversity in specifications, promote availability of information, provide needs, develop expertise. 
 The Approach of EuroSpec is: Fill in gaps in standardisation, focus on topics with high diversity in requirements and high cost, speed up standardisation, exchange needs to industry.
 Our values are: lean, openness, transparency, acceptance of being different.

Legal status and location 
The EuroSpec consortium, as a merger of several legally and economically independent companies that remain for the temporary introduction of an agreed purpose of the operation, has not chosen a legal form and therefore EuroSpec has no official headquarters either. Informally, the headquarters of the incumbent Chair is the location.

Published EuroSpec Specifications 
The EuroSpec consortium publishes the specifications in English only. The following have been published (some in several versions) and are free to download from the EuroSpec website:
 EuroSpec Air Conditioning
 EuroSpec Alternative traction energy supply and related infrastructure interfaces - Battery driven systems
 EuroSpec Automatic Coupler
 EuroSpec Circularity
 EuroSpec Common IDs
 EuroSpec Contact Strips
 EuroSpec Documentation
 EuroSpec Seat Comfort
 EuroSpec Sliding Steps
 EuroSpec On-Board Data Availability
 EuroSpec Parking Noise 
 EuroSpec Requirement Management
 EuroSpec TCMS-Data Service
 Eurospec Toilets of Railway Vehicles
 EuroSpec Watertightness
 EuroSpec Wheel and Brake Disc
The next EuroSpec specifications are under development: External Passenger Access Doors, Exterior Hatches and Panels, Maintenance Software, Alternative Traction Energy Supply and related infrastructure interfaces – Hydrogen driven systems, Global comfort evaluation, Life cycle costs, Upgradeability, Software updates, Update EuroSpec Wheel with Brake Disks, Update EuroSpec Air conditioning.

References

External links 
 Official website EuroSpec
 Official EuroSpec presentation
 Technical Specifications for Interoperability (TSI)
 Reference Document Database (RDD)

Rail transport standards
Standards organizations
Transport organizations based in Europe